Gamma ray observatory or Gamma Ray Observatory can refer to:
 Any observatory used for gamma ray astronomy.
 The Compton Gamma Ray Observatory, an observatory that operated from 1991 to 2000.